The tamarillo (Solanum betaceum) is a small tree or shrub in the flowering plant family Solanaceae (the nightshade family). It is best known as the species that bears the tamarillo, an egg-shaped edible fruit. It is also known as the tree tomato, tomate de árbol, tomate andino, tomate serrano, blood fruit, tomate de yuca, tomate de españa, sachatomate, berenjena, chilto and tamamoro in South America, tyamtar, rambheda or rukh tamatar (lit. tree tomatoes) in Nepal, and terong Belanda (Dutch eggplant) in Indonesia. It is popular globally, especially in Peru, Colombia, New Zealand, Ecuador, Nepal, Rwanda, Burundi, Australia, Bhutan and the United States.

Description

Plant origin and regions of cultivation 
The tamarillo is native to the Andes of Ecuador, Colombia, Peru, Chile, Argentina and Bolivia. Today it is still cultivated in gardens and small orchards for local production, and it is one of the most popular fruits in these regions. Other regions of cultivation are the subtropical areas throughout the world, such as Burundi, Kenya, Rwanda, South Africa, Nagaland, Manipur, Darjeeling and Sikkim in India, Nepal, Hong Kong, China, the United States, Australia, Bhutan and New Zealand. It has also been seen in Cantabria, a province in Spain. 

As of 1993, in New Zealand, about 2,000 tons were produced on 200 hectares of land and exported to the United States, Japan and Europe. For the export, the existing marketing channels developed for the kiwifruit are used.

The first internationally marketed crop of tamarillos in Australia was produced around 1996.

The tamarillo is also successfully grown at higher elevations of Malaysia and the Philippines, and in Puerto Rico. In the hot tropical lowlands, it develops only small fruits and fruit setting is seldom.

Prior to 1967, the fruit was known as the 'tree tomato', but the New Zealand Tree Tomato Promotions Council dubbed it the 'tamarillo' in order to distinguish it from the ordinary garden tomato and increase its exotic appeal. However, the name 'tamarillo' is not universally used, and this plant has a different name in many regions.

Plant 

The plant is a fast-growing tree that grows up to 5 metres. Peak production is reached after 4 years, and the life expectancy is about 5 to 12 years. The tree usually forms a single upright trunk with lateral branches. The flowers and fruits hang from the lateral branches. The leaves are large, simple and perennial, and have a strong pungent smell. The flowers are pink-white, and form clusters of 10 to 50 flowers. They produce 1 to 6 fruits per cluster. Plants can set fruit without cross-pollination, but the flowers are fragrant and attract insects. Cross-pollination seems to improve fruit set.  The roots are shallow and not very pronounced, therefore the plant is not tolerant of drought stress and can be damaged by strong winds. Tamarillos will hybridize with many other solanaceae, though the hybrid fruits will be sterile, and unpalatable in some instances.

Fruit 

The fruits are egg-shaped and about 4-10 centimeters long. Their color varies from yellow and orange to red and almost purple. Sometimes they have dark, longitudinal stripes. Red fruits are more sour, yellow and orange fruits are sweeter. The flesh has a firm texture and contains more and larger seeds than a common tomato. The fruits are very high in vitamins and iron and low in calories (only about 40 calories per fruit).

Cultivation

Soil and climate requirements 
The tamarillo prefers a subtropical climate, with rainfall between 600 and 4000 millimeters and annual temperatures between 15 and 20 °C. It is intolerant to frost (below -2 °C) and drought stress. It is assumed that fruit set is affected by night temperatures. Areas where citrus are cultivated provide good conditions for tamarillos as well, such as in the Mediterranean climate.
Tamarillo plants grow best in light, deep, fertile soils, although they are not very demanding. However, soils must be permeable since the plants are not tolerant to water-logging. They grow naturally on soils with a pH of 5 to 8.5.

Growth 
Propagation is possible by both using seeds or cuttings. Seedlings first develop a straight, about 1.5 to 1.8 meters tall trunk, before they branch out. Propagation by seeds is easy and ideal in protected environments. However, in orchards with different cultivars, cross-pollination will occur and characteristics of the cultivars get mixed up. Seedlings should be kept in the nursery until they reach a height of 1 to 1.5 metres as they are very frost-sensitive.

Plants grown from cuttings branch out earlier and result in more shrub-like plants that are more suitable for exposed sites. Cuttings should be made from basal and aerial shoots, and should be free of pathogenic viruses. Plants grown from cuttings should be kept in the nursery until they reach a height of 0.5 to 1 meter.

The tree grows very quickly and is able to bear fruit after 1.5 to 2 years. The plant is daylength-insensitive. The fruits do not mature simultaneously, unless the tree has been pruned. A single tree can produce more than 20 kg of fruit per year; an orchard yields in 15 to 17 tons per hectare. One single mature tree in good soil will bear more fruit than a typical family can eat in about 3 months.

Tamarillos are suitable for growing as indoor container plants, though their swift growth, their light, water and humidity requirements and their large leaves can pose a challenge to those with limited space.

Plant management 

The tamarillo trees are adaptable and very easy to grow. However, some plant management strategies can help to stabilize and improve plant performance.

Planting 
Planting distances depend on the growing system. In New Zealand, with mechanized production, single row planting distances of 1 to 1.5 metres between plants and 4.5 to 5 metres between rows are recommended. In traditional growing regions such as the Andean region, plantations are much more dense, with 1.2 to 1.5 metres between plants. Dense planting can be a strategy to protect plants against wind. On poorly drained soils, plants should be planted on ridges.

Pruning 
Pruning can help to control fruit size, plant size, harvest date and to simplify the harvesting of fruits. Cutting the tip of young plants leads to the desired branch height. Once the tree shape has been formed, pruning is reduced to the removal of old or dead wood and previously fruited branches, since branches that have already carried fruits will produce smaller fruits with lower quality the next time. Light pruning leads to medium-sized, heavy pruning to large-sized fruits. Basal shoots should be removed. When plants are grown in greenhouses, pruning prevents excessive vegetative growth.

When the tree is about 1 to 1.5 metres in height, it is advisable to cut the roots on one side and lean the tree to the other (in the direction of the midday sun at about 30 to 45 degrees). This allows fruiting branches to grow all along the trunk rather than just at the top.

Mulching 
Since the plants are sensitive to drought stress, mulching can help to preserve moisture in the soil. It can also be a strategy to suppress weeds, as other soil management techniques, such as plowing, are not possible due to the shallow and sensitive root system.

Shelter
The plants have to be protected from wind. Their shallow root system does not provide enough stability, and the lateral branches are fragile and break easily when carrying fruits.

Irrigation and fertilization
To maximize and stabilize production, water and nutrient inputs should be provided when needed. The plants need continuous supply of water due to their shallow root system. Drought stress results in a decrease of plant growth, fruit size and productivity. Recommended fertilizer rates per hectare are 170 kg of nitrogen, 45 kg of phosphorus and 130 to 190 kg of potassium for intensive New Zealand production systems. Phosphorus and potassium are applied in the beginning of the season; nitrogen applications are distributed throughout the year.

Pest management
The tamarillo tree is, compared to similar crops such as tomatoes, quite resistant to pests in general. Still, to reduce risk in intensive production systems, some pests have to be controlled to avoid major crop damage. To control pests, the same control methods as for other  Solanaceae can be used.

Harvest 
Ripening of fruits is not simultaneous. Several harvests are necessary. In climates with little annual variation, tamarillo trees can flower and set fruit throughout the year. In climates with pronounced seasons (such as New Zealand), fruits ripen in autumn. Premature harvest and ethylene induced ripening in controlled-atmosphere chambers is possible with minimal loss of fruit quality. The fragile lateral branches can break easily when loaded with fruits, so premature harvest helps to reduce this risk and allows storage of fruits up to 20 days at room temperature. A cold-water dipping process, developed by the New Zealand Department of Scientific and Industrial Research also allows further storage of 6–10 weeks.

Usage

Culinary use
The fruit is eaten by scooping the flesh from a halved fruit. When lightly sugared and chilled, the flesh is used for a breakfast dish. Some people in New Zealand cut the fruit in half, scoop out the pulpy flesh and spread it on toast. Yellow-fruited cultivars have a sweeter flavor, occasionally compared to mango or apricot. The red-fruited variety, which is much more widely cultivated, is more tart, and the savory aftertaste is far more pronounced. In the Northern Hemisphere, tamarillos are most frequently available from July until November, and fruits early in the season tend to be sweeter and less astringent.

They can be made into compotes, or added to hollandaise, chutneys and curries. Desserts using this fruit include bavarois and, combined with apples, a strudel.

In Colombia, Ecuador, Panama, Venezuela, and parts of Indonesia (including Sumatra and Sulawesi), fresh tamarillos are frequently blended together with water and sugar to make a juice. It is also available as a commercially pasteurized purée.

In Nepal, a version of the South American fruit is very popular. It is typically consumed as a chutney or a pickle during the autumn and winter months. It is known as Tyamtar and Ram Bheda. The fruit is boiled or roasted in open fire till the skin breaks and then mashed with chillies, timur, garlic and other spices of choice. Similar to Nepal, the Indian regions of Ooty, Darjeeling and Sikkim also consume Tamarillo. In Northeast India, it is roasted and chutneys are made with it by blending roasted or fried dried or fermented fish, chillies and garlic. In Ecuador, the tamarillo, known as tomate de árbol, is blended with chili peppers to make a hot sauce commonly consumed with local dishes of the Andean region. The sauce is simply referred to as ají and is present at a wide variety of meals in Ecuador.

In Rwanda, tree tomatoes are often served alongside other tropical fruits, such as mango and pineapple.

In Yunnan, China, the Dai people make a tamarillo nanpie, a sauce like dish made with roasted tamarillo, sawtooth coriander, chillies and garlic. 

The flesh of the tamarillo is tangy and variably sweet, with a bold and complex flavor, and may be compared to kiwifruit, tomato, guava, or passion fruit. The skin and the flesh near it have a bitter taste and are not usually eaten raw.

The tamarillo has been described as having a taste similar to that of a passion fruit and a piquant tomato combined. 

The red and purple types of fruits are preferred in import countries of Europe: Even though they taste more acidic, their color is favoured by consumers.

Industrial use
The fruits are high in pectin and therefore have good properties for preserves. However, they oxidize and lose color when not treated. Yellow fruit types are better suited to industrial use.

Prospects 
Research and breeding should improve plantation management, fruit quality and postharvest treatment. A better understanding of plant physiology, nutritional requirements of plants and fruit set mechanisms will help to improve growing systems. Breeding goals are to break seed dormancy, to improve sweetness of fruits and to increase yield. For industrial uses, little "stones" of sodium and calcium that occasionally appear in the fruit skin form a problem. Those stones have to be eliminated by breeding.

References

External links 
 Audio interview on NPR: "Getting the Taste of the Tamarillo"
 Tamarillo Growers Association Marketing Page
 Tamarillo Fruit Facts - California Rare Fruit Growers
 World Conservation Monitoring Centre 1998.  Solanum betaceum. 2006 IUCN Red List of Threatened Species.   Downloaded on 23 August 2007.

Tropical agriculture
Edible fruits
Edible Solanaceae
Crops originating from the Americas
Crops originating from Ecuador
Crops originating from Peru
Crops originating from Bolivia
Crops originating from Chile
Solanum
Taxa named by Antonio José Cavanilles